Milford Township is a township in Bucks County, Pennsylvania, United States. The population was 9,902 at the 2010 census. It is home to the Quakertown interchange of the Pennsylvania Turnpike Northeast Extension (Interstate 476).

Geography
According to the United States Census Bureau, the township has a total area of 28.1 square miles (72.8 km2), of which 28.1 square miles (72.7 km2)  is land and 0.04 square mile (0.1 km2)  (0.11%) is water. Milford Township is in the Delaware watershed and most of it is drained by the Unami Creek and Macoby Creek into the Perkiomen Creek and Schuylkill River, but an area in the eastern portion is drained eastward by the Tohickon Creek. Other natural features include Butter Creek, Hazelback Creek, Kuglers Roost, Licking Creek, Morgan Run, and Schmoutz Creek.

The township's villages include Brick Tavern, Cressman, Finland, Geryville (also in Montgomery County and pronounced with a hard "g"), Kumry, Milford Square, Mumbauersville, Rosedale, Sleepy Hollow, Spinnerstown, and Steinsburg.

Adjacent municipalities
 Springfield Township (northeast)
 Richland Township (east)
 West Rockhill Township (southeast)
 Marlborough Township, Montgomery County (southwest)
 Upper Hanover Township, Montgomery County (southwest)
 Lower Milford Township, Lehigh County (northwest)
 Upper Saucon Township, Lehigh County (tangent to the north)

The borough of Trumbauersville is surrounded by Milford Township.

Demographics

As of the 2010 census, the township was 94.1% White, 1.5% Black or African American, 0.1% Native American, 1.4% Asian, and 1.3% were two or more races. 1.8% of the population were of Hispanic or Latino ancestry.

As of the census of 2000, there were 8,810 people, 3,073 households, and 2,449 families residing in the township.  The population density was 314.0 people per square mile (121.2/km2).  There were 3,161 housing units at an average density of 112.7/sq mi (43.5/km2).  The racial makeup of the township was 97.75% White, 0.69% African American, 0.09% Native American, 0.65% Asian, 0.01% Pacific Islander, 0.32% from other races, and 0.49% from two or more races. Hispanic or Latino of any race were 1.02% of the population.

There were 3,073 households, out of which 36.9% had children under the age of 18 living with them, 71.0% were married couples living together, 5.3% had a female householder with no husband present, and 20.3% were non-families. 15.9% of all households were made up of individuals, and 5.1% had someone living alone who was 65 years of age or older.  The average household size was 2.80 and the average family size was 3.16.

In the township the population was spread out, with 26.2% under the age of 18, 6.1% from 18 to 24, 31.4% from 25 to 44, 24.9% from 45 to 64, and 11.3% who were 65 years of age or older.  The median age was 38 years. For every 100 females there were 99.1 males.  For every 100 females age 18 and over, there were 96.2 males.

The median income for a household in the township was $59,683, and the median income for a family was $64,563. Males had a median income of $41,132 versus $30,773 for females. The per capita income for the township was $23,559.  About 2.1% of families and 2.9% of the population were below the poverty line, including 3.6% of those under age 18 and 0.8% of those age 65 or over.

Transportation

The Pennsylvania Turnpike Northeast Extension (I-476) is the main highway serving Milford Township. It follows a southeast-to-northwest alignment through the center of the township, interchanging with Pennsylvania Route 663. PA 663, the only other numbered highway serving Milford, follows the Johh Fries Highway along a southwest-to-northeast alignment through central portions of the township.  A local north-to-south thoroughfare is Allentown Road, which extends south from Coopersburg into Montgomery County. Other local roads of note include Geryville Pike, Krammes Road/Spinnerstown Road, Kumry Road, Old Bethlehem Pike, Sleepy Hollow Road/Steinburg Road, and Trumbauersville Road.

Milford Township has intercity bus service available at a park and ride lot along PA 663 at the interchange with I-476. Fullington Trailways provides service from the park and ride lot to the Philadelphia Greyhound Terminal, Hazleton, Williamsport, and several other places in northern Pennsylvania.
Martz Trailways provides service from the park and ride lot to Scranton, Wilkes-Barre, White Haven, Allentown, and Philadelphia. This is an Amtrak Thruway route, connecting to Amtrak trains at 30th Street Station in Philadelphia.

Government and politics

Legislators
 State Representative Craig T. Staats, Republican, 145th district
 State Senator Jarrett Coleman, Republican, 16th district
 US Representative Brian Fitzpatrick, Republican, Pennsylvania's 1st congressional district

Board of Supervisors
 Charles Strunk, Chairman 
 Thomas Courduff,  Vice Chair
 John Mininger

Police
Milford Township is patrolled by the Pennsylvania State Police, Dublin Barracks.

Climate

According to the Köppen climate classification system, Milford Twp has a Hot-summer, Humid continental climate (Dfa). Dfa climates are characterized by at least one month having an average mean temperature ≤ , at least four months with an average mean temperature ≥ , at least one month with an average mean temperature ≥  and no significant precipitation difference between seasons. Although most summer days are slightly humid in Milford Twp, episodes of heat and high humidity can occur with heat index values > . The average wettest month is July which corresponds with the annual peak in thunderstorm activity. Episodes of extreme cold and wind can occur with wind chill values < . Ice storms and large snowstorms depositing ≥  of snow occur once every few years, particularly during nor’easters from December through February.

Ecology

According to the A. W. Kuchler U.S. potential natural vegetation types, Milford Twp would have a dominant vegetation type of Appalachian Oak (104) with a dominant vegetation form of Eastern Hardwood Forest (25). The spring bloom typically begins by April 15 and fall color usually peaks by October 26.

References

External links

 Milford Township

Townships in Bucks County, Pennsylvania